Lu Yen-hsun was the defending champion but decided not to participate.
Yūichi Sugita defeated Hiroki Moriya 6–3, 6–3 in the final.

Seeds

Draw

Finals

Top half

Bottom half

References
 Main Draw
 Qualifying Draw

Shanghai Challenger - Singles
2013 Singles